The following were the scheduled events of sailing for the year 2015 throughout the world.

Events

Olympic classes events

World championships
3–11 July: Nacra 17 World Championship in Aarhus, Denmark
10–17 October: 470 World Championships in Haifa, Israel
17–24 October: RS:X World Championships in Al-Musannah, Oman
Men's RS:X
 : 
 : 
 : 
Women's RS:X
 : 
 : 
 : 
17–22 November: 49er & 49er FX World Championships in Buenos Aires, Argentina
20–30 November: Finn Gold Cup in Takapuna, New Zealand

Sailing World Cup
7 December 2014 – 1 November 2015: 2015 ISAF Sailing World Cup
24–31 January: ISAF Sailing World Cup Miami in Miami, United States
20–26 April: ISAF Sailing World Cup Hyeres in Hyères, France
8–14 June: ISAF Sailing World Cup Weymouth in Weymouth, United Kingdom
14–20 September: ISAF Sailing World Cup Qingdao in Qingdao, China
27 October – 1 November: ISAF Sailing World Cup Final in Abu Dhabi, United Arab Emirates
7 December 2015 – 11 December 2016: 2016 ISAF Sailing World Cup
7–13 December: Sailing World Cup Melbourne in Melbourne, Australia

African championships
4–11 December: Laser African Championship & RS:X African Championships in Algiers, Algeria

Asian championships
26 September – 4 October: RS:X Asian Championships in Enoshima, Japan
16–19 March: 49er & 49er FX African & Asian Championships in Abu Dhabi, United Arab Emirates

European championships
8–17 May: Finn European Championship in Split, Croatia
20–26 June: RS:X European Championships in Mondello, Italy
27 June – 4 July: 470 European Championships in Aarhus, Denmark
6–12 July: 49er & 49er FX European Championships in Porto, Portugal
26 September – 3 October: Nacra 17 European Championship in Barcelona, Spain

North American championships
17–19 January: 470 North American Championships in Coconut Grove, United States
5–8 February: Nacra 17 North American Championship in Clearwater, United States
6–9 February: 49er & 49er FX North American Championships in Clearwater, United States
29 July – 2 August: Laser North American Championship in North Carolina, United States
9–13 August: RS:X North American Championships  in Kingston, Canada
15–18 August: Finn North American Championship in Kingston, Canada

South American championships
3–6 August: 470 South American Championship in Rio de Janeiro, Brazil
5–8 November: 49er & 49er FX South American Championships in Buenos Aires, Argentina
3–8 December: RS:X South American Championships  in Pisco, Peru

Other major events

America's Cup
25 July 2015 – 20 November 2016: 2015–16 America's Cup World Series
25 & 26 July 2015: Portsmouth, United Kingdom
29 & 30 August 2015: Gothenburg, Sweden
17 & 18 October 2015: Hamilton, Bermuda

Extreme Sailing Series
5 February – 13 December: 2015 Extreme Sailing Series
5–8 February: Act #1 in Singapore, Singapore
11–14 March: Act #2 in Muscat, Oman
30 April – 3 May: Act #3 in Qingdao, China
18–21 June: Act #4 in Cardiff, United Kingdom
23–26 July: Act #5 in Hamburg, Germany
20–23 August: Act #6 in Saint Petersburg, Russia
1–4 October: Act #7 in Istanbul, Turkey
10–13 December: Act #8 in Sydney, Australia

Volvo Ocean Race
4 October 2014 – 27 June 2015: 2014–15 Volvo Ocean Race
2 January: In-Port Race in Abu Dhabi, United Arab Emirates
3 January: Leg #3 from Abu Dhabi, United Arab Emirates to Sanya, China
7 February: In-Port Race in Sanya, China
8 February: Leg #4 from Sanya, China to Auckland, New Zealand
14 March: In-Port Race in Auckland, New Zealand
15 March: Leg #5 from Auckland, New Zealand to Itajai, Brazil
18 April: In-Port Race in Itajai, Brazil
19 April: Leg #6 from Itajai, Brazil to Newport, United States
16 May: In-Port Race in Newport, United States
17 May: Leg #7 from Newport, United States to Lisbon, Portugal
6 June: In-Port Race in Lisbon, Portugal
7 June: Leg #8 from Lisbon, Portugal to Lorient, France
14 June: In-Port Race in Lorient, France
17 June: Leg #9 from Lisbon, Portugal to Gothenburg, Sweden
27 June: In-Port Race in Gothenburg, Sweden

World Match Racing Tour
10–14 February: Monsoon Cup in Kuala Terengganu, Malaysia
8 May 2015 – 30 January 2016: 2015 World Match Racing Tour
21–25 May: Match Race Germany in Langenargen, Germany
29 July – 1 August: Sopot Match Race in Sopot, Poland
6–11 October: Argo Group Gold Cup in Hamilton, Bermuda

Other classes

World championships
4–12 June: Dragon World Championship in La Rochelle, France
29 June – 4 July: IFCA Funboard Slalom Youth & Masters World Championships in Reggio Calabria, Italy
11–18 July: RS:X World Youth Championships in Gdynia, Poland
17–25 July: 420 World Championships in Karatsu, Japan
24–31 July: 470 World Junior Championships in Thessalonki, Greece
2–6 August: RS100 World Championship in Aquavitesse, Netherlands
2–7 August: Zoom 8 World Youth Championships in Saaremaa, Estonia
6–14 August: Laser 4.7 World Youth Championships in Medemblik, Netherlands
6–12 September: IFCA Funboard Freestyle World Championships  in Hvide Sande, Denmark
9–13 September: 420 World Team Racing Championships in Campione del Garda, Italy
12–18 September: Swan 45 World Championship in Porto Cervo, Italy
15–18 September: Snipe World Junior Championships in Talamone, Italy
24–31 October: Techno 293 World Championships in Cagliari, Italy
1–8 November: Star World Championship in San Isidro, Argentina
27 December – 3 January 2016: ISAF Youth Sailing World Championships in Langkawi,  Malaysia

African championships
3–12 September: Optimist African Championship in Algiers, Algeria

European championships
23 May – 25 May: RS Feva European Championship in Campione del Garda, Italy
31 May – 7 June: Flying Dutchman European Championship in Croatia
2–7 June: Star European Championship in Gaeta, Italy
3–7 June: European Match Racing Championship in Saint Petersburg, Russia
8–14 June: J/24 European Championship in Ängelholm, Sweden
11–15 June: Tornado European Championship in Lake Lipno, Czech Republic
20–26 June: RS:X Youth European Championship in Mondello, Italy
23–28 June: IKA European Championship in Bozcaada, Turkey
27 June – 3 July: ISWC Speed Windsurfing European Championship in Fuerteventura, Spain
16–26 July: Optimist European Championship in Pwllheli, United Kingdom
23 July – 2 August: Hobie 16 European Championship in Campione del Garda, Italy
31 July – 8 August: Dragon European Championship in Båstad, Sweden
7–15 August: 420 European Junior Championships in Bourgas, Bulgaria
22 August – 30 August: Moth European Championship in Lelystad, Netherlands
7–12 September: EUROSAF Disabled Sailing European Championship in Iberdrola, Spain
12–17 October: J/70 European Championship in Monaco, Monaco
12–19 September: Flying Dutchman European Championship in Umag, Croatia
12–19 September: Soling European Championship in Berlin, Germany

North American championships
3–5 July: Snipe North American Championship in Guelph, Canada
1–6 September: Star North American Championship in Puget Sound, United States
23–27 September: J/70 North American Championship in San Diego, United States

South American championships
27 March – 5 April: Snipe South American Championship in Mar del Plata, Argentina
31 October – 2 November: Star South American Championship in Buenos Aires, Argentina

Other events
26–30 May: Delta Lloyd Regatta in Medemblik, Netherlands
20–28 June: Kiel Week in Kiel, Germany
16–18 August: Fastnet Race from Cowes, United Kingdom to Plymouth, United Kingdom
5–10 October: Semaine Olympique Française in La Rochelle, France

References

 
Sailing by year